The 2012 Midwestern State Mustangs football team represented Midwestern State University in the 2012 NCAA Division II football season as a member of the Lone Star Conference.

Schedule

References

Midwestern State
Midwestern State Mustangs football seasons
Lone Star Conference football champion seasons
Midwestern State Mustangs football